Santiago José Adolfo Altamira Vázquez (born February 14, 1992, in Ocozocoautla de Espinosa) is a Mexican professional footballer who last played for Cafetaleros de Tapachula.

External links

http://www.fuerzamonarca.com/plantel#SantiagoAltamira

1992 births
Living people
Association football defenders
Atlético Morelia players
Ocelotes UNACH footballers
Cruz Azul Hidalgo footballers
Cafetaleros de Chiapas footballers
Ascenso MX players
Liga Premier de México players
Tercera División de México players
Footballers from Chiapas
Mexican footballers